The Tunisia women's national 3x3 team , nicknamed Les Aigles de Carthage (The Eagles of Carthage or The Carthage Eagles), is a national basketball team of Tunisia, administered by the Tunisia Basketball Federation (FTBB). 

It represents the country in international 3x3 women's (3 against 3) basketball competitions.

Competitions

Performance at Summer Olympics

Performance at World Cup

Performance at Africa Cup

Performance at Mediterranean Games

See also
Tunisia women's national basketball team
Tunisia national 3x3 team
Tunisia women's national under-23 3x3 team
Tunisia women's national under-18 3x3 team

References

External links
Official website of the Tunisia Basketball Federation
FIBA Profile
Tunisia Basketball Records at FIBA Archive

Women's national 3x3 basketball teams
Basketball in Tunisia
Women
Basketball